Atok, officially the Municipality of Atok, , is a 4th class municipality in the province of Benguet, Philippines. According to the 2020 census, it has a population of 19,218 people.

History

Spanish period
The area of Atok was previously referred to by the natives and Spanish colonizers as Chontog, an Ibaloi word for "mountainous". Spanish military officials and missionaries arrived at Chontog in 1892, establishing precedencias (tax collection stations) in the area and its surrounding settlements.

The Ibaloi phrase Nay patok shi Chontog, which means "on the mountain top", was later shortened to Atok.

American period
During the American rule, Atok was established as one of the 19 townships of the province of Benguet, upon the issuance of Act No. 48 by the Philippine Commission on November 22, 1900.

On August 13, 1908, Benguet was established as a sub-province of the newly created Mountain Province with the enactment of  Act No. 1876.  As a result, six townships of Benguet were abolished, but Atok remained a constituent town of Benguet sub-province.

World War II
During the Second World War, Atok was the scene of fierce pitch battles between the military forces of the 1st, 2nd, 12th, 13th, 15th and 16th Infantry Division of the Philippine Commonwealth Army, 1st Constabulary Regiment of the Philippine Constabulary, the USAFIP-NL 66th Infantry Regiments, the Igorot and Cordilleran guerrilla fighters and the Japanese Imperial Army forces. The steep terrain along the Halsema road suited Filipino troops, the Philippine Commonwealth military,  and guerrillas to mount ambushes against the Japanese forces. One of these battles took place in what is now “Guerrilla Saddle” located at km. 26, in barangay Caliking.

Post-war era
On June 25, 1963, President Diosdado Macapagal issued Executive Order No. 42 converting eight (8) of the thirteen (13) towns (designated as municipal districts) of Benguet into regular municipalities. Atok was among them.

On June 18, 1966, the sub-province of Benguet was separated from the old Mountain Province and was converted into a regular province. Atok remained to be a component municipality of the newly established province.

Geography

It is bounded by Kibungan on the north, Kabayan on the north-east, Bokod on the southeast, Tublay on the south-west, and Kapangan on the west.

According to the Philippine Statistics Authority, the municipality has a land area of  constituting  of the  total area of Benguet.

The land is characterized as mountainous with many steep cliffs. It is home to Mt. Timbak, the third highest mountain in Luzon. It held formerly the title as the highest point in the Philippine Highway System since World War II until early 2019. This is after the validation and assessment conducted by the Department of Public Works and Highways - Cordillera Administrative Region (DPWH-CAR) Regional Office last January 2019 declaring a new highest point at 2,428.66 meters (7968.045 feet) along the Kiangan-Tinoc-Buguias Road in Tinoc Town some 55 Kilometers east via Atok, Benguet.

Climate

Like most part of Benguet it has subtropical highland climate, during the cold months of the year, the municipality experiences very low temperatures reaching . This causes frost to settle on the ground, causing millions of damage to crops, but drawing tourists to the town.

Barangays
Atok is politically subdivided into 8 barangays. These barangays are headed by elected officials: Barangay Captain, Barangay Council, whose members are called Barangay Councilors. All are elected every three years.

Demographics

In the 2020 census, Atok had a population of 19,218.

Economy

Government
Atok, belonging to the lone congressional district of the province of Benguet, is governed by a mayor designated as its local chief executive and by a municipal council as its legislative body in accordance with the Local Government Code. The mayor, vice mayor, and the councilors are elected directly by the people through an election which is being held every three years.

Elected officials

Education

Public schools
As of 2014, Atok has 22 public elementary schools and 2 public secondary schools.

See also
Benguet–Kōchi Sisterhood Park

Notes

References

External links
 
 
 [ Philippine Standard Geographic Code]

Municipalities of Benguet